Neustadt, Dresden or Dresden-Neustadt may refer to:

 Innere Neustadt (Dresden), a quarter of Dresden
 Äußere Neustadt, a quarter of Dresden
 Dresden-Neustadt railway station
 , an administrative borough (Stadtbezirk) comprising Innere Neustadt, Äußere Neustadt, Leipziger Vorstadt, Radeberger Vorstadt and Albertstadt, see Geography and urban development of Dresden

See also  
 Neustadt (disambiguation)